Gunther Spielvogel (born 27 April 1944) is a German athlete. He competed in the men's high jump at the 1968 Summer Olympics.

References

1944 births
Living people
Athletes (track and field) at the 1968 Summer Olympics
German male high jumpers
Olympic athletes of West Germany
People from Sosnowiec